Ivan Sanchin (real name Alex Ganchin) was from 1939 through 1951 the private projectionist of Soviet leader Joseph Stalin. His story is portrayed in the 1991 film The Inner Circle.

References

KGB officers